Banga, officially the Municipality of Banga (Aklanon: Banwa it Banga; Hiligaynon: Banwa sang Banga), is a 3rd class municipality in the province of Aklan, Philippines. According to the 2020 census, it has a population of 40,318 people.

Banga is the site of the Aklan State University.

History 

The history of Banga dates back to the 15th century upon arrival in Panay Island of the ten datus from Borneo. While some skeptics considered this information a legend, still, Banganhons believed that Datu Manduyog ruled over the place with his seat of government located in Bakan, the ancient name of Banga. The site was at the foot of the Manduyog Hill that was named after Datu Manduyog. Being a legitimate successor to Datu Dangandanan who ruled what was called Akean in the late 1390s, Datu Manduyog became the ruler of Akean in 1437 and made Bakan the capital of Akean.

Another version of Banga's history from Panublion cited that Banga's ancient site was the present location of the Municipality of Malinao. In 1792 the town site was transferred across the Aklan River at the foot of Manduyog Hill. Several prominent families decided to remain in the “old town” which became a barrio and named Malinao after a placid tributary of the Aklan River.

The families of Bernabe Teodosio, Diego Eulalio Teodosio, Esteban Masigon and the Muntuyas established a settlement in 1676 in what is now Sitio Opong-opong of Barrio Cupang. However, these families moved to a higher ground due to its closeness to the Aklan River that overflowed annually. In 1781 they settled in sitio Agbueakan in Barrio Tabayon.

Due to the clayish soil conditions of the sitio, they again decided to resettle in 1783 in what is now the location of Banga poblacion. They named the place Banga after the Banga palm trees that were in abundance. Because of their growing families they had to cut down most of the trees to give way to their layout plans to establish a town close to their farmlands for residential purposes.

American sovereignty over the country started on August 13, 1898. With the natives resisting foreign domination, a revolutionary association was organized. Hostilities between the natives and the Americans began but did not take long since the natives were ill-equipped.

The American hostilities ended upon the signing on March 29, 1901, of the “Pas de Aklan”, a historical document in the Aklan Section of the Province of Capiz. The signing was done at the present municipal park at the corner of Rizal and San Jose Streets.

From January 1, 1904, to December 31, 1911, Banga was merged with Numancia and Lezo to form an “arabal” of the Municipality of Kalibo. Through the efforts of Don Baltazar Teodosio, Banga was separated from Kalibo on January 1, 1912.

A year after, Francisco Lachica was elected the first Municipal President. The following were the leaders of the town from 1912 to 1945:

1912 − 1913     Baltazar Teodosio
1913 − 1916     Francisco Lachica
1916 − 1919     Jacinto Repiedad
1919 − 1925     Edecio Venturanza
1925 − 1931     Baltazar Teodosio
1931 − 1937     Pedro Recto
1937 − 1943     Lorenzo Duran
1943 − 1945     Ereneo Ocutanim

On April 17, 1942, at 2:00 o’clock in the morning, the Japanese Imperial Forces landed at Culasi, Capiz. An hour later the 5th Capiz Cadre at Libas, Banga, Aklan (now Camp Jizmundo) was burned down by the United States Armed Forces in the Far East (USAFFE). Six hours later the Banga Rural High School, Banga Elementary School Building and Home Economics Building were likewise burned. About 95% of all the permanent structures in the Municipality of Banga were burned down both by the USAFFE and the Filipino guerrillas to prevent the Japanese Forces from occupying the buildings.

There was a surprising and infamous incident in Banga during the Japanese occupation. Civilians were massacred at 10:00 o’clock on October 21, 1942, at the junction of Rizal and Mabini Streets - now the Rotunda - and at the national road fronting the 5th Capiz Cadre at Libas, Banga. It was in these two places where civilians, who merely desired to please and welcome the Japanese forces, were ordered to squat and haplessly massacred. About 70 persons were killed. The Japanese soldiers conducted a further four-day operation killing about 200 more in order to paralyze the increasing guerrilla activities.

On March 18, 1945, after the landing of the American Liberation Forces in Panay, the Philippine Civil Affairs Unit appointed Dr. Boanerjes Venturanza as the first Municipal Mayor. The first elected Mayor after the Liberation was Mr. Jose Urquiola. He served from 1945 to 1951 and was succeeded by the following:

1951 − 1959     Atty. Vicente Teodosio
1959 − 1963     Dr. Napoleon Macahilig
1963 − 1971     Atty. Tomas Raz
1971 − 1986     Atty. Sergio Rigodon
1986 − 1995     Mr. Jose Urquiola, Jr.
1995 − 2004     Dr. Stevens Fuentes
2004 − 2007     Atty. Jeremy Fuentes
2007 − 2013     Mr. Antonio Maming
2013 − present Ms. Linda Maming

Geography

According to the Philippine Statistics Authority, the municipality has a land area of  constituting  of the  total area of Aklan.

Climate

Barangays
Banga is politically subdivided into 30 barangays.

Demographics

In the 2020 census, Banga had a population of 40,318.

Economy

Government

List of former local chief executives
The following headed the town from the American Period until the present under two different titles. On 18 March 1945, after the landing of the American Liberation Forces and Philippine Commonwealth troops in Panay, the Philippine Civil Affairs Unit appointed Dr. Boanerjes Venturanza as the first Municipal Mayor.

Municipal presidents:
 1899–uncertain — Francisco Lachica
 1904–1911 — None (town merged with Kalibo)
 1912–1913 — Baltazar Teodosio
 1913–1916 — Francisco Lachica
 1916–1919 — Jacinto Repiedad
 1919–1925 — Edecio Venturanza
 1925–1931 — Baltazar Teodosio
 1931–1937 — Pedro Recto
 1937–1943 — Lorenzo Duran
 1943–1945 — Ereneo Icotanim

Mayors:
 1945 — Dr. Boanerjes Venturanza (appointed)
 1945–1951 — José Urquiola
 1951–1959 — Atty. Vicente Teodosio
 1959–1963 — Dr. Napoleon Macahilig
 1963–1971 — Atty. Tomas Raz
 1971–1986 — Atty. Sergio Rigodon
 1986–1995 — José Urquiola, Jr.
 1995–2004 — Dr. Stevens Fuentes
 2004–2007 — Atty. Jeremy Fuentes
 2007–2013 — Antonio Maming
 2013–Present — Erlinda Maming

Attractions
At the religious sanctuary of Manduyog Hill, an annual pilgrimage is conducted on Good Friday. Devotees practise the 14 Stations of the Cross, pray the rosary, and light candles at each stop while climbing towards the peak where a 40m cross, sometimes lighted, is visible from due north to Kalibo and the nearby sea.

See also
 Maragtas

References

External links

 [ Philippine Standard Geographic Code]

Municipalities of Aklan